Poland competed at the 1956 Winter Olympics in Cortina d'Ampezzo, Italy.  Franciszek Gąsienica Groń won Poland's first ever medal at the Winter Olympic Games.

Medalists

Alpine skiing

Men

Women

Bobsleigh

Cross-country skiing

Men

Men's 4 × 10 km relay

Women

Women's 3 x 5 km relay

Ice hockey

Group B
Top two teams advanced to Medal Round.

USA 4-0 Poland
Czechoslovakia 8-3 Poland

Games for 7th-10th places

Poland 6-2 Switzerland
Poland 4-3 Austria
Italy 5-2 Poland

Nordic combined 

Events:
 normal hill ski jumping (Three jumps, best two counted and shown here.)
 15 km cross-country skiing

Ski jumping

References
Official Olympic Reports
International Olympic Committee results database
 Olympic Winter Games 1956, full results by sports-reference.com

Nations at the 1956 Winter Olympics
1956
1956 in Polish sport